Penny Lake is a lake in Blaine County, Idaho, United States, located in the Smoky Mountains in Sawtooth National Forest. The lake is located along Warm Springs Creek along forest road 227 just west of Dollar Lake and west of the town of Ketchum.

References

Lakes of Idaho
Lakes of Blaine County, Idaho
Sawtooth National Forest